

The OpenSky M-02/M-02j is a Japanese primary glider/jet-powered motor glider inspired by the Möwe aircraft flown by the protagonist in the Hayao Miyazaki anime Nausicaä of the Valley of the Wind. It is a tail-less design intended to be powered on take off and climb for a duration of 10 minutes, then flown unpowered as a glider. As of June 2006, two aircraft prototypes have been constructed, and one has successfully completed a series of 10 unpowered test flights where it flew 98 meters and achieved an altitude of 4 meters after being tow-launched by a tensed elastic cable. The project is led by artist Kazuhiko Hachiya and design by Satoru Shinohe and manufactured by Aircraft Olympos.  The Jet engine installed version, M-02J, had public demonstration flight in June 2016 at Takikawa, Hokkaido.

Variants
Möwe 1/2 (メーヴェ1/2) — sub-scale, radio-controlled development aircraft
 M-01 — unpowered development aircraft
 M-02  a total of 2 airframes of M-02 were built, 1 for preliminary gliding practice and 1 for installing Jet engine with no intention to mass-production.  The glider version airframe is a collection of 21st Century Museum of Contemporary Art, Kanazawa since 2008.
 M-02J (14 June 2007) Modified M-02 airframe has had a Jet engine installed. (14 April 2010) Vehicle M-02 has undergone high speed taxi tests at Fukusima Sky Park runway, in order to evaluate stability and acceleration. More details of the jet engine assembly are available, and the engine has a considerable separation from the walls of the engine pod, in order to permit better cooling and prevent the wood and composite airframe from encountering an excessive fire risk.

Specifications (M-02 and M-02J)

References

External links

 
OpenSky webpage (Japanese)
AC-Olympos website (Japanese)

2000s Japanese sport aircraft
Motor gliders
Tailless aircraft
Aircraft first flown in 2006